Jüri Annusson (11 July 1884, in Enge Parish (now Põhja-Pärnumaa Parish), Kreis Pernau – 1965, in the United States) was an Estonian politician. He was a member of I Riigikogu, representing the Estonian Labour Party.

In 1920-1921 he was Minister of Education.

References

1884 births
1965 deaths
People from Põhja-Pärnumaa Parish
People from Kreis Pernau
Estonian Labour Party politicians
Education ministers of Estonia
Members of the Riigikogu, 1920–1923
Estonian World War II refugees
Estonian emigrants to Germany